Santa Catarina may refer to:

Places

Brazil
Santa Catarina (state), one of Brazil's  federal states
Santa Catarina (island), located in Santa Catarina state
Santa Catarina (hospital), located in the city of São Paulo

Cape Verde
Santa Catarina, Cape Verde, a municipality

Curaçao
Santa Catarina, Curaçao, a small town (also spelled Santa Catharina)

Guatemala
Santa Catarina Barahona, a town in Sacatepéquez Department
Santa Catarina Ixtahuacan, a town in Sololá Department
Santa Catarina Mita, a town in Jutiapa Department
Santa Catarina Palopó, a town in Sololá Department

Mexico
Santa Catarina, Guanajuato, a town in the state of Guanajuato
Santa Catarina, Morelos, a town in the state of Morelos
Santa Catarina, Nuevo León, a city in the state of Nuevo León
Santa Catarina Municipality, Nuevo León, a municipality in the state of Nuevo León
Santa Catarina Ayometla (municipality), a municipality in the state of Tlaxcala
Santa Catarina de Tepehuanes, a town in the state of Durango
Misión Santa Catarina Virgen y Mártir, a colonial-era Dominican mission in Ensenada, Baja California

Oaxaca
 Santa Catarina Cuixtla
 Santa Catalina Quierí
 Santa Catarina Ixtepeji
 Santa Catarina Juquila
 Santa Catarina Lachatao
 Santa Catarina Loxicha
 Santa Catarina Mechoacán
 Santa Catarina Minas
 Santa Catarina Quiané
 Santa Catarina Quioquitani
 Santa Catarina Tayata
 Santa Catarina Ticuá
 Santa Catarina Yosonotú
 Santa Catarina Zapoquila

Portugal
Santa Catarina (Caldas da Rainha), a freguesia of Caldas da Rainha
Santa Catarina (Lisbon), a freguesia of Lisbon

United States
Santa Catarina, Texas, an unincorporated community in Starr County, Texas, United States

Other uses
 Santa Catarina (ship), a Portuguese carrack that was seized by the Dutch East India Company off the coast of Singapore in 1603
 St. Catharina, a Roman Catholic parish in Dinklage, Germany

See also
Santa Caterina (disambiguation)
Santa Catalina (disambiguation)
St. Catherine (disambiguation)